Hernán López Muñoz (born 7 September 2000) is an Argentine professional footballer who plays as a midfielder for Central Córdoba on loan from River Plate.

Career
López played for Pacífico Villa del Parque, Juventud de Devoto, Agronomía, Cultural de Tapiales and Argentinos Juniors at youth level before joining the academy ranks of Primera División side River Plate in 2014; where he'd notably win the Generation Adidas Cup in back-to-back years from 2016. His breakthrough into senior football came on the final day of the 2018–19 campaign, with Marcelo Gallardo selecting the midfielder off the bench in a Primera División fixture versus Tigre on 7 April 2019. He came on with thirty-one minutes left in place of Jorge Carrascal, prior to scoring for 2–2 with four minutes remaining; though Tigre went on to win.

Personal life
López is a great-nephew of the Argentine international footballer Diego Maradona. His paternal great-grandfather Diego Maradona "Chitoro" (1927–2015), who worked at a chemicals factory, was of Guaraní (Indigenous) and Spanish (Galicians) descent, and his paternal great-grandmother Dalma Salvadora Franco, "Doña Tota" (1930–2011), was of Italian descent.

Career statistics
.

References

External links

2000 births
Living people
Footballers from Buenos Aires
Argentine footballers
Association football midfielders
Argentine Primera División players
Club Atlético River Plate footballers
Argentine people of Guaraní descent
Argentine sportspeople of Italian descent
Argentine people of Basque descent
Maradona family